Edmund Cornelius George Burke (June 2, 1905 – October 7, 1993) was a Canadian professional ice hockey player who played 106 games in the National Hockey League. He was born in Toronto, Ontario and played for the Boston Bruins and New York Americans. Burke also coached the Boston Tigers of the Canadian-American Hockey League (CAHL). After his career in hockey, he disappeared and his whereabouts remain unknown, although some sources indicate that he died in 1969.

Career statistics

Regular season and playoffs

References

External links
 
Obituary at LostHockey.com

1905 births
1993 deaths
Boston Bruins players
Boston Cubs players
Boston Tigers (CAHL) players
Buffalo Bisons (IHL) players
Canadian ice hockey right wingers
New York Americans players
Philadelphia Arrows players
Ice hockey people from Toronto
Syracuse Stars (AHL) players
Syracuse Stars (IHL) players
20th-century Canadian people